Kallikrein-13 is a protein that in humans is encoded by the KLK13 gene.

Function 
Kallikreins are a subgroup of serine proteases having diverse physiological functions. 

As of 2022, the precise physiological functions of Kallikrein 13 remain unknown. It may play a role in the defense of the upper digestive apparatus, in extracellular matrix degradation, in tissue remodelling, and in the male reproductive organs.

This gene is one of the fifteen kallikrein subfamily members located in a cluster on chromosome 19. Expression of this gene is regulated by steroid hormones and may be useful as a marker for breast cancer. An additional transcript variant has been identified, but its full length sequence has not been determined.

Kallikrein-13 serves as a priming protease during infection by the human coronavirus HKU1.

Many kallikreins are implicated in carcinogenesis and some have potential as novel cancer and other disease biomarkers.

References

Further reading

External links
 The MEROPS online database for peptidases and their inhibitors: S01.306